Jim McAllester (born 16 April 1959) is a former Australian rules footballer who played with Essendon, Footscray and Collingwood in the Victorian Football League (VFL).

McAllester could play as a ruckman but was mostly used as either a forward and defender during his career.

After serving an apprenticeship in the under-19s, McAllester made two senior appearances for Essendon in 1980 but did not register a possession in either game.

He spent the 1981 and 1982 seasons at Footscray before playing at East Ballarat in 1983.

McAllester played with Collingwood in 1984 and 1985, but was restricted to the reserves in the latter season. Upon leaving Collingwood, he joined the Brunswick Football Club.

References

1959 births
Australian rules footballers from Victoria (Australia)
Essendon Football Club players
Western Bulldogs players
Collingwood Football Club players
Brunswick Football Club players
East Ballarat Football Club players
Living people